These are the official results of the Women's 3000 metres event at the 1990 European Championships in Split, Yugoslavia, held at Stadion Poljud on 27 and 29 August 1990.

Medalists

Final

Heats

Participation
According to an unofficial count, 23 athletes from 15 countries participated in the event.

 (1)
 (1)
 (1)
 (1)
 (2)
 (1)
 (3)
 (1)
 (1)
 (3)
 (1)
 (2)
 (1)
 (3)
 (1)

See also
 1986 Women's European Championships 3,000 metres (Stuttgart)
 1987 Women's World Championships 3,000 metres (Rome)
 1988 Women's Olympic 3,000 metres (Seoul)
 1991 Women's World Championships 3,000 metres (Tokyo)
 1992 Women's Olympic 3,000 metres (Barcelona)
 1993 Women's World Championships 3,000 metres (Stuttgart)
 1994 Women's European Championships 3,000 metres (Helsinki)

References

 Results

3000
3000 metres at the European Athletics Championships
1990 in women's athletics